Analitica is a digital communication medium specialized in the informative stories of political, economic, and international events. It was created in 1996 as a medium dedicated to an opinion about Venezuela.

At present, it is a company specialized in the publication of opinion and analysis articles on current issues in the political, economic, social, global, environmental, scientific, artistic, entertainment and business fields.

Venezuelan news websites